Lu Zongyu (1876–1941) was a Chinese diplomat at the Paris Peace Conference after World War I. Because of subscribing Twenty-One Demands supporting Japanese interests, along with Zhang Zongxiang and Cao Rulin, he was blamed as Hanjian ("traitor to the Chinese people") by students participating May Fourth Movement.

Awards and decorations

Order of Rank and MeritOrder of Wen-HuOrder of the Rising Sun

Ambassadors of the Republic of China
Republic of China politicians from Zhejiang
1876 births
1941 deaths
Chinese police officers
Politicians from Jiaxing